Mirza Hameedullah Beg (M. H. Beg) (22 February 1913 – 19 November 1988) was the 15th Chief Justice of India, serving from January 1977 to February 1978.

Early life and education
Born into a Muslim family, his father Mirza Samiullah Beg was the Chief Justice of Hyderabad State, making him an important figure in Hyderabad state affairs.
He was real uncle of internationally acclaimed beautician Shahnaz Hussain.

As was the case with many children of aristocracy in Hyderabad at the time, M.H. Beg attended St. George's Grammar School, where he earned a gold medal for first position in Senior Cambridge H.S.L.C. Examination.

As India was still under heavy British influence, it was common for wealthy Indians to receive higher education in England, particularly when studying law. Thus, M.H. Beg joined the renowned Trinity College and Cambridge University in 1931, and earned Honours in Archaeological and Anthropological and Historical Triposes. He studied law, economics and politics at the London School of Economics. He joined the bar through the Honourable Society of Lincoln's Inn. He was called to the Bar in England in 1941.

Judicial career
After graduation, M.H. Beg returned to India to begin practising as an Advocate for the Allahabad High Court, at Allahabad and Meerut. From here, M.H. Beg began working up experience in the judicial system. In 1949, he enrolled as an Advocate of the Federal Court of India, and eventually he became an Advocate of the Supreme Court of India. After building up an extensive practice on all sides he became Standing Counsel to the U.P. Sunni Central Wakf Board and appeared frequently for Municipal bodies.

After experience as Counsel, Beg was then raised to the Bench of the Allahabad High Court on 11 June 1963. As Judge, he sat on the Criminal and Civil sides as well as on the Tax Bench. Later, he was appointed Company Judge and became in charge of the matrimonial and testamentary jurisdiction of the High Court from the middle of 1967 to 1970. Shortly after territories were redrawn and the state of Himachal Pradesh was established, M.H. Beg was appointed Chief Justice of the Himachal Pradesh High Court in January 1971.

After a short term as Chief Justice of the Himachal Pradesh High Court, Beg was elevated to Judge of the Supreme Court of India on 12 December 1971.

Habeas Corpus case
Beg was also involved in the Habeas Corpus case.  This landmark case in Indian democracy, Additional District Magistrate of Jabalpur v. Shiv Kant Shukla, came up in 1975 during the Indian Emergency.  The legal question hinged on the citizen's right to judicial scrutiny for arrests under emergency.  The five seniormost judges of the Supreme court heard the case, and four aligned with the government view that even the right to life stood suspended during emergency (only dissent was H. R. Khanna).  In his April 1976 decision, Justice Beg observed:

A few months later, in January 1977, M.H. Beg, who was junior to H. R. Khanna, was appointed Chief Justice of India by the Indira Gandhi government.  This was against legal tradition, though it had started with A. N. Ray's appointment.  This impingement into the independence of the judiciary was widely protested; subsequent law ministers, particularly Shanti Bhushan, initiated a series of measures to bring judicial appointments within the power of the Chief Justice, and not the executive.

After Mohammad Hidayatullah, Beg was the second Muslim Chief Justice in India. After a one-year term, Beg retired in February 1978.

Subsequently, Beg served as chairman of the Minorities Commission of India.

Academics
While practising as an Advocate, Beg took on various faculty positions teaching various subjects:
Professor, Constitutional Law and Equity at Meerut College (1943–1946)
Taught Law of Evidence, Human Law, and Ancient Law at Allahabad University(1946–1963)
Standing Counsel to the Allahabad University
Member of the International Law Association and of the World Association of Judges

Since retirement, Beg has written two books discussing Muslim politics in India:

Impact of Secularism on Life and Law, published in 1985
Human Rights and Asia, published in 1978

Awards
 1988: Padma Vibhushan India's second highest civilian award for his contribution towards Law and Public Affairs

References

External links
Reference to the "late M. Hameedullah Beg"

1913 births
1988 deaths
Alumni of Trinity College, Cambridge
Alumni of the University of London
Alumni of the London School of Economics
Indian barristers
20th-century Indian judges
20th-century Indian Muslims
Chief justices of India
Scholars from Lucknow
Judges of the Allahabad High Court
Chief Justices of the Himachal Pradesh High Court
Recipients of the Padma Vibhushan in public affairs
20th-century Indian lawyers